The 1973 Texas Longhorns baseball team represented the University of Texas at Austin in the 1973 NCAA University Division baseball season. The Longhorns played their home games at Clark Field. The team was coached by Cliff Gustafson in his 6th season at Texas.

Personnel

Roster

Schedule and results

Notes

References

Texas Longhorns baseball seasons
Texas Longhorns
Southwest Conference baseball champion seasons
College World Series seasons
Texas Longhorns